Franc Moody are a musical duo from London, England. The band consists of Ned Franc and Jon Moody.

Their first EP Dance Moves was released in 2018, their first album Dream In Colour was released in 2020. In 2021, an EP titled House of FM followed. On 2 September 2022, they released a new studio album titled "Into the Ether".

Musical influences
Franc Moody cite Daft Punk, James Brown and Jamiroquai as musical influences.

Discography

Studio albums
 Dream In Colour (2020)
 Into The Ether (2022)

EPs
 Dance Moves (2018)
 House of FM (2021)

References

External links
 

English funk musical groups
English pop music groups
Musical groups from London